This article contains records and statistics for the Japanese professional football club, Nagoya Grampus.

Key

 P = Played
 W = Games won
 D = Games drawn
 L = Games lost
 F = Goals for
 A = Goals against
 Pts = Points
 Pos = Final position

 J1 = J1 League
 J2 = J2 League

 F = Final
 Group = Group stage
 QF = Quarter-finals
 QR1 = First Qualifying Round
 QR2 = Second Qualifying Round
 QR3 = Third Qualifying Round
 QR4 = Fourth Qualifying Round
 RInt = Intermediate Round

 R1 = Round 1
 R2 = Round 2
 R3 = Round 3
 R4 = Round 4
 R5 = Round 5
 R6 = Round 6
 SF = Semi-finals

Seasons

AFC history

References

Nagoya Grampus
Nagoya Grampus